José Carrasco  (born ) is a Venezuelan male volleyball player. He was part of the Venezuela men's national volleyball team at the 2014 FIVB Volleyball Men's World Championship in Poland. He played with Yaracuy.

Clubs
 Yaracuy (2014)

References

1989 births
Living people
Venezuelan men's volleyball players
Place of birth missing (living people)
Volleyball players at the 2020 Summer Olympics
Olympic volleyball players of Venezuela
20th-century Venezuelan people
21st-century Venezuelan people